Volodymyr Hudyma (born 20 July 1990 in Ukrainian SSR) is a professional Ukrainian football striker who last played for the I liga (Poland) club Chrobry Głogów.

Career
Hudyma is the product of the Karpaty Lviv Youth School System. He made his debut for FC Karpaty entering as a second-half substitute against FC Kryvbas Kryvyi Rih on 5 May 2010 in Ukrainian Premier League.

References

External links
 
 
 

1990 births
Living people
Ukrainian footballers
FC Karpaty Lviv players
FC Karpaty-2 Lviv players
FC Nyva Ternopil players
Ukrainian Premier League players
Ukrainian expatriate footballers
Expatriate footballers in Poland
Chrobry Głogów players
Ukrainian expatriate sportspeople in Poland
Association football forwards